Joseph Talcott (November 16, 1669 – October 11, 1741) was the 26th governor of the Connecticut Colony from 1724 until his death in 1741.

Biography
Talcott was born in Hartford, Connecticut, the son of Lieutenant-Colonel John and Helena Wakeman Talcott. He married Abigail Clark in 1693 and the couple had three sons. Abigail died in 1704. His second wife was Eunice Howell with whom he had five more children.

Career
Descended from one of Connecticut's founding settlers, Talcott was appointed an assistant (member of the governor's council) in 1711. He held a number of city and state offices; justice of the peace in 1705, and beginning in 1710, he was a major in the First Regiment of the Colony of Connecticut. His position of major continued to 1723. He was a member of the committee to lay out the town of Coventry in 1711. He owned property in several Connecticut towns. In May 1714, he was appointed as a judge of the Hartford County Court and he became Judge of the Superior Court of Hartford in May 1721.

In 1723, Talcott was elected Deputy Governor upon the death of Nathan Gold; then following the sudden death of Gurdon Saltonstall, he was made Governor. He was the first Connecticut Governor to be born in the state. He was re-elected annually until his death, for a total of seventeen years and five months in office. This time was only surpassed by Gov. John Winthrop's eighteen years in office.

Death and legacy
Talcott died on October 11, 1741. He is interred in the Ancient Burying Ground in Hartford. Talcott Street in Hartford bears his name.

References

External links
Order of the Descendants of Colonial Governors prior to 1750
Talcott Pedigree in England and America

Colonial governors of Connecticut
1669 births
1741 deaths
Politicians from Hartford, Connecticut
State treasurers of Connecticut
People of colonial Connecticut
Burials in Connecticut